Lutgarde Thijs (born 2 January 1962 in Neerpelt) is a Belgian sprint canoer who competed in the mid-1980s. She finished ninth in the K-2 500 m event at the 1984 Summer Olympics in Los Angeles.

References
 Sports-Reference.com profile

1962 births
Belgian female canoeists
Canoeists at the 1984 Summer Olympics
Living people
Olympic canoeists of Belgium
People from Neerpelt
Sportspeople from Limburg (Belgium)